The 2015 Copa do Brasil (officially the 2015 Copa Sadia do Brasil for sponsorship reasons) was the 27th edition of the Copa do Brasil football competition. The competition was contested by 87 teams, which qualified either by participating in their respective state championships (71), by the CBF Rankings (10), by qualifying for the 2015 Copa Libertadores (5) or having the best 2014 Série A record (excluding those qualified for 2015 Copa Libertadores). The latter 6 clubs entered the competition in the 4th stage. The best six teams of the 2014 Brazilian Championship eliminated until the third round qualified for the 2015 Copa Sudamericana.

The competition was won by Palmeiras, which earned their third title by defeating fellow São Paulo club Santos in a penalty shootout.

Format

The competition was a single elimination knockout tournament featuring two-legged ties. In the first two rounds, if the away team won the first match by two or more goals, it progressed straight to the next round avoiding the second leg. The away goals rule was also used in the Copa do Brasil, but not for the finals. The winner qualifies for the 2016 Copa Libertadores.

Qualified Teams
The teams (in bold) were qualified directly for the fourth stage (round of 16).

Draw
A draw by CBF for the first round was held on December 16, 2014. The 81 qualified teams were divided in eight pots (A-H) with 10 teams each. They were divided based on the CBF rankings and the matches were drawn from the respective pots: A x E; B x F; C x G; D x H. The lower ranked teams of each match hosted the first leg. Before the round of 16 there was another draw including the six teams directly qualified to the 4th round.
CBF ranking shown in brackets.

Preliminary round

|}

Preliminary match

Real Noroeste won 4–2 on aggregate.

First round

|}

Second round

|}

Third round

|}

Copa Sudamericana qualification
The best six teams eliminated before the round of 16 with the best 2014 Série A or 2014 Série B record (excluding those directly qualified for the Round of 16) qualified for 2015 Copa Sudamericana.

Knockout stages

The draw for the knockout stages was held by CBF on 4 August 2015. The 16 qualified teams were divided in two pots. Teams from pot 1 were the six teams directly qualified to the round of 16, the five teams that competed at the 2015 Copa Libertadores and the best placed team in the 2014 Brazilian Série A not taking part in the 2015 Copa Libertadores, plus the two highest CBF ranked teams qualified via the third round. Pot 2 was composed of the other teams that qualified through the third round. Each pot was divided into 4 pairs according to the CBF ranking. For the remaining stages of the tournament another draw was held on 31 August 2015.

Seeding

Bracket

Round of 16

|}

Quarterfinals

|}

Semifinals

|}

Finals

Top goalscorers

Notes

References

 
Copa do Brasil seasons
Copa do Brasil
Brasil